Andrés Eloy Martínez Rojas (born 23 June 1963) is a Mexican astronomer, scientist and politician. He has named various minor planets and also served one three-year term as a deputy in the LXII Legislature of the Mexican Congress representing Morelos.

Astronomy 

Martínez Rojas has discovered various minor planets and has proposed names for planetary features. In 2017, the minor planet 6159 Andréseloy was named in his honor.

In 2003, he proposed to name a newly discovered crater on Mars after Jojutla, which was approved by the International Astronomical Union in 2007.

Martínez Rojas presides over the Sociedad Astronómica Urania de México, an astronomy society. In 2015, the society successfully proposed the names Tonatiuh and Meztli for the HD 104985 system and planet HD 104985b, respectively, which were selected in the NameExoWorlds worldwide contest. Additionally, he has written science columns for various publications including El Universal and Scientific American México; he formerly hosted a radio show on XHART-FM, which is owned by his mother, Araceli Rojas Tenorio. He carried out the 1998 and 2008 reenactments of The War of the Worlds that the station aired, causing panic among its listeners.

He is currently regional coordinator of Asteroid Day in Mexico.

Federal deputy 
In 2012, residents of the Fourth Federal Electoral District of Morelos, with seat in Jojutla, elected Martínez Rojas as the candidate of the Party of the Democratic Revolution to the district's seat in the Chamber of Deputies. He was a secretary on the Science and Technology Commission and also served on the Communications and Rural Development Commissions. While at the Chamber of Deputies, he helped to install a radiotelescope in the San Lázaro Legislative Palace.

In 2014, Martínez Rojas changed parties from the PRD to the National Regeneration Movement (MORENA).

References 

1963 births
Living people
Mexican astronomers
Mexican scientists
Members of the Chamber of Deputies (Mexico) for Morelos
Morena (political party) politicians
Party of the Democratic Revolution politicians
People from Cuernavaca
21st-century Mexican politicians
Politicians from Morelos
Deputies of the LXII Legislature of Mexico